Graeme Phillip Jennings (born 1968) is an Australian classical violinist and music educator.

He has performed with the Elision Ensemble and Arditti Quartet. Jennings' 2005 performance of Brian Ferneyhough's violin concertante Terrain, was described as "transfixing either as a display of fiddling pyrotechnics, or as an exercise in mind-bending mathematics, or as a lovingly crafted exploration of gestures". In 2017, he performed Elliot Carter's Duo for Violin and Piano in Hobart, a piece so difficult Jennings was only one of a handful of violinists in the world who could play it.

References

External links 
GRAEME JENNINGS

1968 births
Australian classical violinists
Male violinists
Living people
Queensland Conservatorium Griffith University alumni
Academic staff of Queensland Conservatorium Griffith University
21st-century classical violinists
21st-century Australian male musicians